A by-election was held in the Dáil Éireann Dublin Central constituency in Ireland on Friday, 5 June 2009, following the death of the Independent Teachta Dála (TD) Tony Gregory on 2 January 2009. The by-election was held on the same day as the 2009 European and local elections. A by-election was held in the Dublin South constituency on the same date. There was no legal requirement on when to hold a by-election in Ireland in 2009 but they were generally held within six months.

The independent candidate Maureen O'Sullivan, Gregory's former election agent, was elected on the eighth count.

Result

See also
2009 Dublin South by-election
List of Dáil by-elections
Dáil constituencies

References

2009 in Irish politics
2009 elections in the Republic of Ireland
30th Dáil
By-elections in the Republic of Ireland
2000s in Dublin (city)
By-elections in County Dublin
June 2009 events in Europe
Elections in Dublin (city)